These are the films shown at the 4th New York Underground Film Festival, held from March 19–23, 1997.

See also
 New York Underground Film Festival site
 1997 Festival Archive

New York Underground Film Festival
Underground Film Festival
1997 film festivals
1997 in American cinema
1997 festivals in the United States